Njuga is a village in  the Ruvuma Region of southwestern Tanzania. It is located along the A19 road, to the east of  Mlete and west of Nahoro.

References

External links
Maplandia

Populated places in Ruvuma Region